Chatham Head is a Neighbourhood in the city of Miramichi, New Brunswick. It is located on the south side of the Miramichi River, approximately 3.7 km north of Nelson. Notable areas found in the community are the Chatham Head Church, the Chatham Head Recreation & Community Centre, and the Waldo Henderson Memorial Field - home of the Chatham Head Tigers.

Notable people

See also
List of neighbourhoods in Miramichi, New Brunswick

References
 

Neighbourhoods in Miramichi, New Brunswick